California Star was an  refrigerated cargo liner that was built in 1945 as Empire Clarendon by Harland and Wolff Ltd, Belfast for the Ministry of War Transport (MoWT). In 1947 she was sold and renamed Tuscan Star, then Timaru Star in 1948. She was sold again in 1950 and was renamed California Star in 1959. She was scrapped in 1969.

Description
Harland and Wolff Ltd built the ship at Belfast as yard number 1231. She was launched on 4 May 1945 and completed in October 1945.

Accommodation was provided for 35 passengers. This was reduced to 12 in 1948.

The ship was propelled by a Burmeister & Wain-type two-stroke single cycle double-acting marine Diesel engine that had eight cylinders of  diameter by  stroke.

History
Empire Clarendon was built for the MoWT.

On 27 November 1946, Empire Clarendon was sold to Frederick Leyland & Co Ltd. She was placed under the management of the Blue Star Line Ltd. In 1947 she was renamed Tuscan Star, followed by another renaming to Timaru Star in 1948. In 1949, she was sold to Lamport & Holt Line Ltd, Liverpool. She was renamed California Star in 1958, and sold to the Blue Star Line Ltd in 1959. With the introduction of IMO Numbers, 5058002 was allocated to California Star. In March 1968 California Star was laid up in the River Blackwater, Essex. Re-entering service by July 1968, she served until 1969, when she was sold to Tsuan Yau Steel & Iron Works Co Ltd. She arrived on 21 April 1969 at Kaohsiung, Taiwan for scrapping, which was commenced on 20 May 1969.

References

External links
 – colour photo
 – later photo

1945 ships
Cargo liners
Empire ships
Ministry of War Transport ships
Merchant ships of the United Kingdom
Ships built by Harland and Wolff
Ships built in Belfast
Ships of the Blue Star Line
Ships of the Lamport and Holt Line